Platyptilia locharcha is a moth of the family Pterophoridae. It is known from Zimbabwe.

References

locharcha
Endemic fauna of Zimbabwe
Lepidoptera of Zimbabwe
Moths of Sub-Saharan Africa
Moths described in 1924